Game or quarry is any wild animal hunted for animal products (primarily meat), for recreation ("sporting"), or for trophies. The species of animals hunted as game varies in different parts of the world and by different local jurisdictions, though most are terrestrial mammals and birds. Fish caught non-commercially (recreational fishing) are also referred to as game fish.

By continent and region 

The range of animal species hunted by humans varies in different parts of the world. This is influenced by climate, faunal diversity, popular taste and locally accepted views about what can or cannot be legitimately hunted. Sometimes a distinction is also made between varieties and breeds of a particular animal, such as wild turkey and domestic turkey. The flesh of the animal, when butchered for consumption, is often described as having a "gamey" flavour. This difference in taste can be attributed to the natural diet of the animal, which usually results in a lower fat content compared to domestic farm-raised animals.

In some countries, game is classified, including legal classifications with respect to licenses required, as either "small game" or "large game". A single small game licence may cover all small game species and be subject to yearly bag limits. Large game are often subject to individual licensing where a separate permit is required for each individual animal taken (tags).

Africa 

In some parts of Africa, wild animals hunted for their meat are called bushmeat; see that article for more detailed information on how this operates within the economy (for personal consumption and for money) and the law (including overexploitation and illegal imports). Animals hunted for bushmeat include, but are not limited to:
 Various species of antelope, including duikers
 Various species of primates like mandrills or gorillas
 Rodents like porcupines or cane rats
Some of these animals are endangered or otherwise protected, and thus it is illegal to hunt them.

In Africa, animals hunted for their pelts or ivory are sometimes referred to as big game.

Also see the legal definition of game in Eswatini.

South Africa 
South Africa is a famous destination for game hunting, with its large biodiversity and therefore impressive variety of game species. Many creatures have returned to former areas from which they were once taken as a result of being killed for big-game hunting. Commonly hunted species include:

 Springbok
 Impala
 Steenbok
 Oribi
 Bushbuck
 Nyala
 Greater Kudu
 Common Eland
 Blue Wildebeest
 Black Wildebeest
 Blesbok
 Bontebok
 Sable Antelope
 Roan Antelope
 Gemsbok
 Giraffe
 Cape Buffalo
 Southern White Rhinoceros
 Plains Zebra

South Africa also has 62 species of gamebirds, including guineafowl, francolin, partridge, quail, sandgrouse, duck, geese, snipe, bustard and korhaan. Some of these species are no longer hunted, and of the 44 indigenous gamebirds that can potentially be utilised in South Africa, only three, namely the yellow-throated sandgrouse, Delegorgue's pigeon and the African pygmy goose warrant special protection. Of the remaining 41 species, 24 have shown an increase in numbers and distribution range in the last 25 years or so. The status of 14 species appears unchanged, with insufficient information being available for the remaining three species. The gamebirds of South Africa where the population status in 2005 was secure or growing are listed below:

 Helmeted guineafowl
 Greywing partridge
 Redwing partridge
 Orange River partridge
 Cape francolin
 Natal francolin
 Swainson's francolin
 Common quail
 Harlequin quail
 Namaqua sandgrouse
 Double-banded sandgrouse
 Burchell's sandgrouse
 White-faced duck
 Egyptian goose
 Yellow-billed duck
 Red-billed teal
 Cape shoveler
 Southern pochard
 Knob-billed duck
 Spur-winged goose

Oceania

Australia 

In Australia, game includes:

 Deer and sambar
 Duck
 Magpie geese
 Dingo
 European rabbit
 Feral cat
 Red fox
 Wild pig
 Wild goat
 Kangaroo
 Emu
 Crocodile (Saltwater and Freshwater)
 Feral buffalo
 Banteng ("Scrub bull")
 Feral camel
 Australian feral horse
 Quail
 Wild bull
 Blackbuck
 Feral donkey
 Feral dog

New Zealand 

Game in New Zealand includes:
 Chamois
 Deer, multiple species
 Pig
 Tahr
 Duck, multiple species

North America

Canada and the United States 

In the United States and Canada, white-tailed deer are the most commonly hunted big game. Other game species include:

Asia

People's Republic of China 
In the PRC there is a special cuisine category called ye wei, which includes animals in the wild.

Russia 

 Anser
 Beaver
 Black grouse
 Brown bear
 Common quail
 Deer
 Duck
 European hare
 Fox
 Ground squirrel
 Goose
 Hazel grouse
 Eurasian lynx
 Mountain hare
 Perdix
 Pheasant
 Rabbit
 Raven
 Siberian ibex
 Squirrel
 Wild boar
 Woodcock

Europe

United Kingdom 

In the UK game is defined in law by the Game Act 1831. It is illegal to shoot game on Sundays or at night. Other non-game birds that are hunted for food in the UK are specified under the Wildlife and Countryside Act 1981. UK law defines game as including:
 Black grouse (No longer hunted due to decline in numbers)
 Red grouse
 Brown hare
 Rock ptarmigan
 Grey and red-legged partridges
 Common pheasant

Deer are not included in the definition, but similar controls provided to those in the Game Act apply to deer (from the Deer Act 1991). Deer hunted in the UK are:
 Red deer
 Roe deer
 Fallow deer
 Sika deer
 Muntjac deer
 Chinese water deer
 and hybrids of these deer

Other animals which are hunted in the UK include:
 Duck, including mallard, tufted duck, teal, northern pintail and common pochard
 Goose, including greylag goose, Canada goose and pink-footed goose
 Wood pigeon
 Cuckoo
 Eurasian woodcock
 Common snipe
 Rabbit
 Eurasian golden plover
 Corncrake

Capercaillie are not currently hunted in the UK because of a recent decline in numbers and conservation projects towards their recovery. The ban is generally considered voluntary on private lands, and few birds live away from RSPB or Forestry Commission land allegedly.

Iceland 

In Iceland game includes:
 Reindeer
 Rock ptarmigan, a popular Christmas dish in Iceland
 Puffin
 Auk
 Goose
 Mallard

Nordic countries 

Game in Norway, Sweden, Denmark and Finland includes:

 Moose, Alces alces. Moose hunting season in October is close to a national pastime.
 Fallow deer
 Red deer
 Roe deer
 Mountain hare
 Boar in Denmark and southern Sweden. (Once hunted to extinction, boars were re-introduced in the late 20th century and are now considered a pest by farmers, but an asset by hunters.)
 Rock ptarmigan
 Willow ptarmigan
 Mallard
 Auk in Norway
 Black grouse
 Woodcock
 Common pheasant
 Common wood pigeon
 Goose

Poland 
In Poland, legal game includes:
Big game

 Moose
 Red deer
 Sika deer
 Fallow deer
 Roe deer
 Wild boar
 European mouflon

Small game

 Fox
 Common raccoon dog
 Badger
 European pine marten
 Beech marten
 American mink
 Polecat
 (American) raccoon
 Muskrat
 European hare
 European rabbit
 Hazel grouse
 Common pheasant
 Grey partridge
 Greylag goose
 Bean goose
 Greater white-fronted goose
 Mallard
 Eurasian teal
 Common pochard
 Tufted duck
 Common wood pigeon
 Eurasian woodcock
 Eurasian coot

Preparation 

Game meat is typically taken from a wild animal that has been shot with a gun or bow. Hunters must be absolutely certain of their target before shooting and should make every effort to get the animal down as quickly and painlessly as possible. Once obtained, game meat must be processed to avoid spoiling. The method of processing varies by game species and size. Small game and fowl may simply be carried home to be butchered. Large game such as deer is quickly field-dressed by removing the viscera in the field, while very large animals like moose may be partially butchered in the field because of the difficulty of removing them intact from their habitat. Commercial processors often handle deer taken during deer seasons, sometimes even at supermarket meat counters. Otherwise the hunter handles butchering. The carcass is kept cool to minimize spoilage.

Traditionally, game meat was hung until "high" or "gamey", that is, approaching a state of decomposition. However, this adds to the risk of contamination. Small game can be processed essentially intact, after gutting and skinning or defeathering (by species). Small animals are ready for cooking, although they may be disjointed first. Large game must be processed by techniques commonly practiced by commercial butchers.

Cooking 

Generally game is cooked in the same ways as farmed meat. Because some game meat is leaner than store-bought beef, overcooking is a common mishap which can be avoided if properly prepared. It is sometimes grilled or cooked longer or by slow cooking or moist-heat methods to make it more tender, since some game tends to be tougher than farm-raised meat. Other methods of tenderizing include marinating as in the dish Hasenpfeffer, cooking in a game pie or as a stew such as burgoo.

Safety 
The Norwegian Food Safety Authority considers that children, pregnant women, fertile-aged women, and people with high blood pressure should not consume game shot with lead-based ammunition more than once a month. Children who often eat such game might develop a slightly lower IQ, as lead influences the development of the central nervous system.

See also 

 Animal trapping
 Big game hunting
 British Association for Shooting and Conservation
 Bushfood
 Bushmeat
 Endangered species
 Fishing
 Game fish
 Game & Wildlife Conservation Trust
 Game drive system
 Hunter-gatherer
 Hunting horn
 Hunting and shooting in the United Kingdom
 Hunting
 Legislation on hunting with dogs
 Ornithology
 Overfishing
 Persistence hunting
 Taxidermy, the preserving of an animal's body for the purpose of display or study
 Waterfowl hunting
 Wildlife
 Yewei

References

External links 
 

Hunting
Meat by animal
Poultry
 
Non-timber forest products